The 2001 Quebec protests was a mass uprising, marked by riots and popular civil protests, against the 3rd Summit of the Americas from 21 to 22 April in Quebec City. Mass protests was met with tear gas and grenades was thrown by police, who claimed demonstrators were storming buildings. Protests ceased on 22 April.

Background
Quebec has been a centrepiece for the summit, and has seen harsh police repression and police brutality during previous movements, and is known for its national independence movement and nationalist movement for deep independence. In 1968, 1974, 1986 and 1996, movements occurred throughout the state. Protesters marched for their rights and an end of the 3rd Summit of the Americas.

Protests
Police claimed that their actions were justified in protecting delegates from "red-zone" attempts to break through the fence, as well as to violent protesters destroying property and attacking the police, the media, and other protesters.

Many protesters accuse the police of excessive force, claiming that the police's abundant use of tear gas and rubber bullets was both completely disproportionate to the scale of violence, and primarily directed at unarmed, peaceful demonstrators with dispersal of violent protesters an afterthought. A number of protesters were severely injured by rubber bullets; also, tear gas canisters were fired directly at protesters on numerous occasions, in violation of the protocols governing their use. They also criticize the actions of prison authorities. Altogether, the anti-globalization movement describes the actions of the police in Quebec City as an attempt to suppress dissent.

See also
 2012 Quebec student protests

References

2001 protests
Protests in Canada